Earl Jones (born July 20, 1949) was a Democratic member of the North Carolina General Assembly representing the state's 60th House district. First elected in November 2002, he took office in January 2003. In 2010, he was defeated in the Democratic primary by Marcus Brandon. His term ended in January 2011.

He ran in the HD-60 Democratic primary in 2014, but was defeated by Cecil Brockman.

Jones is a lawyer, publisher & newspaper owner from Greensboro, North Carolina. He owns and publishes the Greensboro Times, which focuses on the African-American perspective, and cofounded Greensboro's International Civil Rights Center and Museum.

Jones previously served on Greensboro's City Council for eighteen years, and served as legal counsel to Greensboro's NAACP.

Electoral history

2014

2012

2010

2008

2006

2004

2002

References

External links

1949 births
Living people
People from Greensboro, North Carolina
North Carolina Central University alumni
Southern University alumni
North Carolina lawyers
20th-century African-American people
21st-century American politicians
21st-century African-American politicians
African-American state legislators in North Carolina
Greensboro, North Carolina City Council members
Democratic Party members of the North Carolina House of Representatives